The Dreieck Havelland (German: Autobahndreieck Havelland, abbreviated AD Havelland) is a trumpet interchange in the German state of Brandenburg in the metropolitan region of Berlin.

The interchange connects the A24 coming from Hamburg to the  A10, the Berlin-beltway.

Geography 
The interchange lies in the region of Havelland after which it is named, in the municipal area of Oberkrämer and Kremmen in the Landkreis Oberhavel. The nearby towns are Schönwalde-Glien und Nauen. It lies approximately 30 km northwest of the Berlin city centre.

History 

Dreieck Havelland was built as a trumpet interchange between 1972 and 1979, as they were extending the Berlin-beltway.

In July 2011, the plans were made to widen the road from junction Neuruppin (A24) to junction Oberkrämer (A10) into 2x3 lanes. Together with this plan they reconstructed the interchange. On 17 September 2012 the work not part Dreieck Havelland–Kremmen began.

The official opening of the interchange to traffic was on 18 November 2014.

Traffic near the interchange 
Manual traffic counts near the interchange in 2010:

In 2025 they forecast 65,000 vehicles per day in every direction.

References

External links 
 Hintergrundinformationen zum Ausbau: Landesbetrieb Straßenwesen Brandenburg
 Baustellendokumentation Fotos und Videos: laufend ergänzte Luftbilddokumentation

Havelland
Buildings and structures in Oberhavel